Michael Anaba (born 30 December 1993) is a Ghanaian professional footballer who plays for FK Kauno Žalgiris.

Club career
Born in Kumasi, Anaba started his professional football career with Windy Professionals, a division two football team based in Winneba. He joined Asante Kotoko in September 2011, and featured regularly for the side, also winning the Ghana Premier League in the 2012–13 campaign.

In January 2013 Kotoko blocked Anaba's move to Valencia CF. He was also linked to Parma F.C. in the same transfer window, but nothing came of it.

In late July 2013, Anaba joined Elche CF in a trial basis. On 13 August, the club agreed a fee with Kotoko, and the player signed a four-year deal late in the month.

Anaba was initially assigned to the reserves in Segunda División B. In July 2014 he was called up to the main squad for the pre-season, being definitely promoted to the first-team in the following month.

On 11 October 2014 Anaba returned to the B-side, due to the lack of opportunities in the main squad. He only made his first team debut on 30 August 2015, playing the last 13 minutes in a 2–1 Segunda División home win against Bilbao Athletic.

On 27 January 2016, Anaba was loaned to CD Alcoyano in the third level until June. Upon returning, he rescinded his contract on 30 August, and joined CD Eldense the following day.

On 23 January 2017, Anaba switched teams and countries by agreeing to a contract with Uruguayan Primera División side Sud América. On 14 August, he returned to Spain after joining third-tier club Ontinyent CF.

In July 2020, Anaba joined Kuwaiti club Al-Jahra SC. A year later, in September 2021, Anaba returned to Spain and joined Atzeneta UE.

International career
Anaba was a member of the Ghana under-20's during the 2013 African U-20 Championship qualification for the 2013 African U-20 Championship. In 2013, he was named in Sellas Tetteh's 23-man squad for the 2013 tournament, hosted in Algeria. He was appointed vice-captain, and featured regularly during the tournament.

Anaba was also selected to 2013 FIFA U-20 World Cup hosted in Turkey. He was used mainly as a substitute during the competition, but started and captained his side in a 1–2 loss against France. Anaba also appeared in the third-place match, again from the bench in a 3–0 win against Iraq.

Honours
Club
Ghana Premier League: 2012–13

International
African Youth Championship: 2013 Runners-up
FIFA U-20 World Cup: 2013 Third place

References

External links

Michael Anaba at Fotbolltransfers

1993 births
Living people
Footballers from Kumasi
Ghanaian footballers
Ghana under-20 international footballers
Association football midfielders
Asante Kotoko S.C. players
Segunda División players
Segunda División B players
Tercera División players
Uruguayan Primera División players
Allsvenskan players
Windy Professionals FC players
Elche CF Ilicitano footballers
Elche CF players
CD Alcoyano footballers
CD Eldense footballers
Ontinyent CF players
Sud América players
AFC Eskilstuna players
Al Jahra SC players
Atzeneta UE players
2013 African U-20 Championship players
Ghanaian expatriate footballers
Ghanaian expatriate sportspeople in Spain
Ghanaian expatriate sportspeople in Sweden
Ghanaian expatriate sportspeople in Uruguay
Ghanaian expatriate sportspeople in Kuwait
Expatriate footballers in Spain
Expatriate footballers in Uruguay
Expatriate footballers in Sweden
Expatriate footballers in Kuwait